The Mossman River is a river located in the Cape York Peninsula of Far North Queensland, Australia.

The headwaters of the river rise under Devils Thumb on the Mount Carbine Tableland in the Great Dividing Range. The river flows through a deeply incised valley in the Mount Lewis Forest Reserve in an easterly direction and then through the Mossman Gorge, part of the Daintree National Park, and onto the coastal plain past the township of Mossman, where the river is crossed by the Captain Cook Highway. The river eventually discharges into Trinity Bay and the Coral Sea between Newell and Cooya Beach. The river descends  over its  course.

The river was named by the explorer George Dalrymple in 1873 after Hugh Mosman who discovered gold in Charters Towers. Dalrymple wrote "I named this river the Mossman River, after Mossman, an explorer and mining man, member of a very prominent mining family."

History 
The traditional language area of Kuka-Dyangan (also known as Djangun, Gugu Djangun and Kuka Djangun) includes landscape within the local government boundaries of the Douglas Shire and Cook Shire.

Yalanji  (also known as Kuku Yalanji, Kuku Yalaja, Kuku Yelandji, and Gugu Yalanji) is an Australian Aboriginal language of Far North Queensland. The traditional language region is Mossman River in the south to the Annan River in the north, bordered by the Pacific Ocean in the east and extending inland to west of Mount Mulgrave. This includes the local government boundaries of the Shire of Douglas, the Shire of Cook and the Aboriginal Shire of Wujal Wujal and the towns and localities of Cooktown,  Mossman, Daintree, Cape Tribulation and Wujal Wujal. It includes the head of the Palmer River, the Bloomfield River, China Camp, Maytown, and Palmerville.

See also

References

Rivers of Far North Queensland
Bodies of water of the Coral Sea